The British Rail Class 803 AT300 is a type of electric multiple unit built by Japanese rolling stock manufacturer Hitachi Rail for open-access operator Lumo. Based on the Hitachi A-train design, a total of five units comprising five cars have been produced.

Background
In 2015, following an announcement from the Office of Rail and Road that it would be allowing open-access operators to bid for additional rail paths on the East Coast Main Line, FirstGroup submitted a proposal to operate services between London and Edinburgh. Under its plan, First would seek to directly compete with existing road, rail and air services by offering all standard class seating with an average ticket price of approximately £25. The proposal for the new service was approved in May 2016.

In March 2019, First announced that it had signed an agreement with Hitachi to procure a total of five new five-car trains from its A-train product line for its new service. The units are financed by Beacon Rail with a ten-year maintenance contract. The first body shell arrived at Hitachi's Newton Aycliffe Manufacturing Facility in April 2020.

The first test runs on the national network were held on 26 May 2021, with the class entering public service on Lumo's launch day of 25 October 2021.

Operation 
While sharing a bodyshell with the previous UK A-train variants, the Class 803 differs in that it has no diesel engines fitted. They are fitted with batteries to enable the train's on-board services to be maintained, in case the primary electrical supplies have failed. Other changes include seating being standard class only, and the lack of a galley area, although catering services are provided through the use of a trolley service. The units also feature air conditioning, power sockets and free Wi-Fi.

Fleet details

Accidents and incidents
Several passengers sustained minor injuries. The Rail Accident Investigation Branch opened an investigation into the incident.

References

High-speed trains of the United Kingdom
Hitachi multiple units
25 kV AC multiple units
Train-related introductions in 2021